is a Japanese visual novel developed by Circus and was first released on December 23, 2004. An all-ages version, followed on September 27, 2007 for the PlayStation 2. In 2007 the game was adapted by studio Zexcs as an original net animation (ONA) series.

Gameplay
Saishu Shiken Kujira's gameplay requires little interaction from the player as most of the game's duration is spent reading the text that appears on the game screen, which represents either dialogue between the various characters or the inner thoughts of the protagonist. After progressing through the text, the player will come to a "decision point" where he or she must choose from multiple options. The time between these decision points varies. Gameplay pauses at these points and depending on which choice the player makes, the plot will progress in a specific direction. With the consumer ports, if an undesired choice was selected, there would be an option to rewind the story to correct the mistake. However, if the player reaches a bad end to a storyline, the player does not have this option and must reload the game at the last saved point.

Plot
Riku is a stage actor, traveling around frequently. One day, he comes to a small town and gets involved in a mysterious world as if led by fate. Strange and sad past memories. This town was the strange world where the whale floats in the sky. He has to take the "final test" to solve the world's mysteries.

References

 "Saishu Shiken Kujira". Newtype USA. 6 (10) p. 12. October 2007. .

External links
 Official website of the visual novel 
 Official website of the web anime 
 

Bishōjo games
Windows games
PlayStation 2 games
2004 video games
Eroge
Visual novels
2007 anime ONAs
Zexcs
Japan-exclusive video games
Video games developed in Japan
Circus (company) games